Xanthomyia japonica is a species of tephritid or fruit flies in the genus Xanthomyia of the family Tephritidae.

Distribution
Russia, China, Japan.

References

Tephritinae
Insects described in 1933
Diptera of Asia